Arulmigu Subramaniya Swamy Temple is a Hindu temple, on the hill of Thiruttani, Tiruvallur district, Tamil Nadu, India, dedicated to Lord Muruga. The hill has 365 steps indicating 365 days of the year. It is fifth among the six abodes of Lord Muruga (Aarupadai veedugal) The other five are Palani Murugan Temple, Swamimalai Murugan Temple, Thiruchendur Murugan Temple, Thiruparankundram and Pazhamudircholai Murugan Temple. It is the only adobe located within the Greater Chennai Metropolitan Area limit. During the Sangam era, Thiruttani was known as Kundruthoradal. After killing the demon Tharakasura in Tiruchendur, he came here to subside his anger, so Soorasamharam is not conducted here.

History
The origins of this temple, are buried in antiquity. This temple has been mentioned in the Sangam period work Tirumurugaatruppadai composed by Nakkeerar. It has been patronized by the Vijayanagar rulers and local chieftains and zamindars. The original animal mount of Murugan is believed to have been an elephant, compared to the peacock which is considered to be the most common mount. The white elephant, is considered a powerful, terror striking animal. The iconography is maintained only in two places, namely, this temple and Tiruttani Murugan Temple.

Legend
Legend also has it that Indra the king of the Gods gave his daughter Deivayanai in marriage to Skanda, and along with her presented his elephant Airavatam as part of his offering. Upon Airavatam's departure Indra found his wealth waning. Subramanyar is said to have offered to return the white elephant, however Indra bound by protocol refused to accept a gift that he had made, and insisted that the elephant face his direction, hence the image of the elephant in this temple also faces the east. 

Another legend has it that Indra presented a sandal stone as a part of his daughter's gift. The sandal paste made on this stone is applied to the image of Subramanya and the applied paste is said to acquire medicinal value. Legend also has it that Skanda bore the discus thrown by the demon Tarakasuran on his chest, and hence there is a hollow in the chest region of the image of Subramanya in this temple. Legend also has it that Skanda gifted the discus to Vishnu. Skanda is also believed to have imparted knowledge of Tamil to the sage Agasthyar and he is regarded as Veeramurthy, Gnanamurthy and Acharyamurthy in this shrine. 

Lord Rama, after putting an end to Ravana, worshipped Lord Siva at Rameswaram and then came to Tiruttani to find perfect peace of mind by worshipping Lord Subrahmanya here. In Dvapara Yuga, Arjuna got the blessings by offering prayers to Him on his way to the South for Teertha Yatra (pilgrimage to take sacred immersion). Vishnu prayed to the Lord and got back his powerful Chakra (sacred wheel), Shanku (sacred conch), which were forcibly seized from him by Tarakasura, brother of Soorapadma. Lord Brahma propitiated the Lord here at the holy spring known as Brahmasonai after his imprisonment by our Lord for his failure to explain the Pranava ('Om' mantra) and got back his creative function of which he was deprived by our Lord due to his egotistic impudence in neglecting to worship Subrahmanya on his way to Mount Kailasa to worship Siva.
The final steps to the eastern entrance.

On worshipping at Thanikai, the king of snakes Vasuki got his bodily wounds healed, which had been caused during the churning process in the Milky Ocean to secure the Amrita (nectar of immortality) by the devas and asuras when the Mantotra Mountain was used as the churning base and the snake king Vasuki as the rope. Sage Agasthyar Muni (of Potikai Hill) worshipped Muruga at Tanikai when he was blessed with the divine gift of the Tamil language.

Architecture

The temple is located on a hill named Thanigai hill reached with 60 steps. The temple has a five-tiered gopuram and four precincts. There are several water bodies associated with the temple. The temple has two shrines, namely, Murugan in the form of Shaktidharar and the shrines of Valli and Deivayanai in two other shrines.

Religious significance
Apart from its puranic greatness, Saint Arunagirinathar has praised this hill as the chosen place for worship by devas and the favorite abode of saints performing prolonged tapas. He also compared this hill to Sivaloka (Bhuloka) and as the very soul of the world. Sri Muthuswami Dikshitar, who lived 200 years ago (one of the trinity of Carnatic music) had his inspiration in Tiruttani when Murugan (in the guise of an old man) met him on the steps and sweetened his tongue with the prasadam of this temple, which impelled him to compose and render his first krithi "Shri Nathadhi Guruguho Jayathi Jayathi"(song) Murugan of Tanikai. The temple vimanam was covered by gold.

Administration
The temple is maintained and administered by the Hindu Religious and Charitable Endowments Department of the Government of Tamil Nadu.

Timings
Usually the temple is open from 5:45a.m. to 21:00. On special days, the temple is open full day in between 12pm to 3 pm is closed on some festival time

Festivals
Besides the monthly Kiruthikais which attract a large number of devotees to this shrine, the two outstanding annual festivals are the Aadi Krittikai and 31 December New Year Step Festival. The float festival is celebrated in the month of Aadi, Bhramotsavam in the month of Maasi, during which Valli Kalyanam is celebrated on the 8th day, and the Skanda Sashti is celebrated in the Tamil month of Aippasi.

Aadi Krittikai
Aadi Krittikai festival (in July–August) lasts for three days with Float Festival when hundreds of thousands of devotees come to this holy place from far and near. The streets are thronged to the full. About one fifty thousand flower kavadis (which increase with each year) are offered to the deity. The sight of the devotees who carry them, uttering the sacred and inspiring "Haro Hara!" as they march and dance in long rows touches the very core of devotees' hearts and makes them spellbound.

Notes

References

External  links
Official Temple page
Murugan Temples

Hindu temples in Tiruvallur district
Murugan temples in Tamil Nadu
Kaumaram